Domremy or Domrémy is part of the name of several communes in France:

 Domremy-la-Canne, in the Meuse department
 Domrémy-la-Pucelle, in the Vosges department, formerly Domrémy, which was the birthplace of Joan of Arc
 Domremy-Landéville, in the Haute-Marne department

In Canada:

 Domremy, Saskatchewan, a small hamlet
 Domremy Beach, Saskatchewan, a small hamlet